Synd iNNOVATE 2019 was the National Level Hackathon conducted by Syndicate Bank in September 2019 to encourage Innovation in Banking Industry. It attracted more than 3,500 ideas from applicants from all over India out of which final 40 teams were called for Onsite Hackathon.

Themes

Synd iNNOVATE 2019 had thirteen themes to participate, which are as follows:

 Open Innovation
 Customer Social Profiling
 Voice Based Customer Grievance redressal System
 An App for Agents(Referral Marketing & Affiliate Marketing)
 Branch wise customer ranking for the use of Digital Banking Channels & Rewards Mechanism for the same
 A centralized system for checking Branch Ambience & Cleanliness
 WhatsApp Business integration for amazing customer experience.
 Automated Queue Management System for Branch.
 Developing automated system for Identification & Triggering alert when a High Net Worth customer visits the Branch and/or using our Digital Platform like Internet/Mobile Banking etc.
 Mobile number verification of customers through QR scan, Missed Call or any other easy procedure
 Design of UX/UI for LAPS
 Early Fraud Detection Mechanism
 Customer Acquisition

Synd iNNOVATE received more than 3500 Ideas in all the themes combined. Then 400 teams were shortlisted to participate in 2nd round for submission of online prototype, out of these 400 prototypes, 40 were selected for final onsite Hackathon in Bengaluru.

Hackathon Schedule & Management

Synd iNNOVATE was managed by Bhanu Srivastav from Syndicate Bank. who was working in Business Process Re-Engineering & Innovation Department in Syndicate Bank Corporate Office. The event was managed by Hackerearth.

The Hackathon was scheduled in 3 phases:

Phase 1 Idea Submission (Online)

Phase 2 Prototype submission (Online)

Phase 3 Onsite Hackathon (Offline)

The prize money for the winners was:

1st Prize - Rs 3,00,000/-

2nd Prize - Rs 2,00,000/-

3rd Prize - Rs 1,00,000/-

10 Consolation Prizes - 10,000/-

Reception

The final event was organized successfully in Bengaluru.

References

Hackathons
2019 conferences
Mobile phone culture
Software development events